Salwator Cemetery, is a historic cemetery in the Salwator neighborhood of Kraków located north-west of the city centre. It was consecrated in 1865.

History

The Salwator Cemetery is also known as the Zwierzyniecki Cemetery for its location in the Zwierzyniec District of Kraków, next to widely popular Kościuszko Mound. It is perceived by the locals as the nicest cemetery in the city. However, the Salwator Cemetery does not feature in the official list of heritage sites, and does not receive financial support from the council. The graves and the cemetery grounds are maintained by the Parish of St. Salwador in Kraków with the help from volunteer parishioners. In 2002 a brand new chapel was erected there, based on design by Witold Cęckiewicz.

See also
 :Category:Burials at Salwator Cemetery
 List of cemeteries in Poland

References

Roman Catholic cemeteries in Poland
Cemeteries in Kraków
Tourist attractions in Kraków
1865 establishments in Poland